Xavier Louis Suarez (born May 21, 1949) is an American politician who was the first Cuban-born Mayor of Miami and was a Miami-Dade county commissioner.

Early life and education
He was born on May 21, 1949, in Las Villas, Cuba. Suarez attended the Colegio de Belén but graduated from St. Anselm's Abbey School in 1967. He earned a Bachelor of Engineering from Villanova University in 1971, followed by a Master of Public Administration and Juris Doctor from Harvard University.

Career 
After completing his education, Suarez returned to Miami and was sworn in as mayor on November 13, 1985, succeeding Maurice Ferré.

Suarez was first elected mayor in 1985. He was re-elected in 1987 and again in 1989 for a four-year term. Suarez was highly regarded as mayor of Miami. While mayor, Suárez declared "Yahweh ben Yahweh Day" on October 7, 1990, a month before Yahweh ben Yahweh was indicted. Suarez cited the construction of 1,500 affordable homes as one of his "proudest achievements" during his tenure. He was also given the name "pothole mayor" for his attention to city neighborhoods.

He decided not to run again in 1993 in order to spend more time with his family. He returned to practice law in Miami before he decided to run again in November 1997 and was re-elected. However, on March 5 of the following year, Suarez was effectively removed from office on account of voting fraud. While Suarez was not personally implicated, the prosecuting circuit court judge cited the district as ''the center of a massive, well-conceived and well-orchestrated absentee ballot voter fraud scheme.'' People working for Suarez's campaign were found forging voter signatures, including at least one of a dead citizen.

Suarez ran for numerous positions in Miami-Dade including mayor of Miami-Dade County in 1996, mayor of Miami in 2001, Miami-Dade commissioner in 2004, a seat in the Florida House of Representatives in 2006.

Suarez was elected as a Miami-Dade County commissioner for District 7 on May 24, 2011, and was re-elected by a 44-point margin on August 30, 2016. In 2020, term-limited from his seat, Suarez ran for county mayor, finishing in fourth place behind former county mayor Alex Penelas.

During his time as mayor, Suarez also received attention for refusing to greet South African President Nelson Mandela during his 1990 tour of the United States which included a stop in Miami. Suárez was in disagreement with Mandela's comments where he referred to Cuban President Fidel Castro as a "brother in arms" due to Castro's support for the African National Congress.

Personal life
He is married to Rita and they have four children, the Republican (and current) Mayor of Miami Francis Xavier Suarez, Olga Marie Vieira, Anna Teresita, and Carolina Suárez. His sister, Lala, is the mother of U.S. Congressman Alex Mooney from West Virginia.

References

External links

|-

1948 births
American politicians of Cuban descent
Hispanic and Latino American mayors in Florida
Living people
Villanova University alumni
Harvard University alumni
Mayors of Miami
County commissioners in Florida
Florida lawyers
Florida Independents